Brockite is a rare earth phosphate mineral with formula: . It crystallizes in the hexagonal system in the chiral space group 180 or its enantiomorph 181. It is typically granular to massive with only rare occurrence of stubby crystals. It is radioactive due to the thorium content.

Discovery and occurrence
Brockite was first described in 1962 for an occurrence in the Bassick Mine area, Querida, Wet Mountains, Custer County, Colorado, US. It was named for Maurice R. Brock, of the U.S. Geological Survey.

Brockite occurs in granite and granite pegmatite as an accessory mineral. Associated minerals include monazite, bastnasite, xenotime, thorite, zircon, apatite, rutile and hematite.

References

Phosphate minerals
Hexagonal minerals
Minerals in space group 180 or 181